Arlington Heights is one of two commuter railroad stations along Metra's Union Pacific Northwest Line in the village of Arlington Heights, Illinois.

As of May 31, 2022, Arlington Heights is served by 55 trains (27 inbound, 28 outbound) on weekdays, by all 34 trains (17 in each direction) on Saturdays, and by all 21 trains (10 inbound, 11 outbound) on Sundays. One inbound train originates from Arlington Heights on weekends.

Parking is available along Northwest Highway and the north side of the tracks from east of Walnut Avenue to Dunton Avenue. It is also available on the south side of the tracks between Vail and Dunton Avenues leading into Payton Run. A much larger parking lot exists on the south side of the track between Evergreen Avenue and Arlington Heights Road north of Sigwalt Street. A fourth parking lot is available north of US 14 along Vail Avenue between St. James and Fremont Streets. Three others are not available to commuters.

There is a newsstand, restroom and staffed (weekday mornings) ticket agent inside the station building.

Pace Bus Connections
 696 Harper College/Woodfield/Arlington Heights/Randhurst

References

External links

Station from Dunton Avenue from Google Maps Street View

Metra stations in Illinois
Station
Former Chicago and North Western Railway stations
Railway stations in Cook County, Illinois
Railway stations in the United States opened in 2000